The Broken Melody is a 1934 British musical drama film directed by Bernard Vorhaus and starring John Garrick, Margot Grahame, Merle Oberon and Austin Trevor.

The film was made at Twickenham Studios. The film's sets were designed by the studio's resident art director James A. Carter.

Plot
A composer kills his wife's lover and, having escaped from the prison on Devil's Island, returns to France and writes an opera about the experience.

Cast
 John Garrick as Paul Verlaine  
 Margot Grahame as Simone St. Cloud  
 Merle Oberon as Germaine Brissard  
 Austin Trevor as Pierre Falaise  
 Charles Carson as Colonel Dubonnet  
 Harry Terry as Henri  
 Andreas Malandrinos as M. Brissard  
 Toni Edgar-Bruce as Vera  
 Conway Dixon as Colonel's Friend  
 Stella Rho as Lisette as Simone's Maid  
 Kynaston Reeves as Colonel Fitzroy

References

Bibliography
 Low, Rachael. Filmmaking in 1930s Britain. George Allen & Unwin, 1985.
 Wood, Linda. British Films, 1927-1939. British Film Institute, 1986.

External links

1934 films
1930s musical drama films
Films set in France
Films about composers
British black-and-white films
Films shot at Twickenham Film Studios
Films directed by Bernard Vorhaus
1934 drama films
1930s English-language films
1930s British films